Bandhan is a 1956 black and white Indian Hindi-language film starring Meena Kumari, Pradeep Kumar and Motilal in lead roles. The film was directed by Hemchandra Chunder.

Plot
In order to get their share of inheritence, Bani's parents have to get her married before she turns eighteen, to a suitable Brahmin boy, as per her grandfather's condition. Belonging to a rich and affluent family, she's married off to a poor but good-hearted preacher Amarnath. Will Bani accept her fate? All this and much more is to be expected from this family drama.

Cast

 Meena Kumari as Bani
 Pradeep Kumar as Amarnath
 Motilal as Binod
 Asit Sen as Vijay
 Achala Sachdev as Rama
 Nana Palsikar as Acharya ji
 Shashikala as Shanta
 David
 Minoo Mumtaz
 Leela Mishra

Accolades
 1957: The film received an All India Certificate of Merit at 4th National Film Awards by the then President of India.

Soundtrack
The film had seven songs in it. The music of the film was composed by Hemant Kumar. Rajendra Krishan wrote the lyrics.

 "Dhool Mein Jaise" - Hemant Kumar
 "Brindavan Ki Kunj Gali" - Lata Mangeshkar
 "Jo Milna Hai Bhagwan Se" - Hemant Kumar
 "Mere Devta Mujhko Dena Sahara" - Lata Mangeshkar
 "Jaise Paani Chhupa Ghata Mein" - Hemant Kumar
 "Hasino Ke Aankho Ke Dore Gulabi" - Asha Bhosle
 "Dulah Ram Siya Dulhari" - Bela Mukherjee, Hemant Kumar

References

1950s Hindi-language films
Indian drama films
1956 drama films